The discography of Shannon Noll, an Australian rock singer-songwriter, consists of six studio albums, two compilation albums, thirty-five singles (including seven as a featured artist) and one DVD. Noll came to fame in 2003 on the first season of Australian Idol and was runner-up to Guy Sebastian. He was subsequently signed to Sony BMG Australia and released the Moving Pictures classic "What About Me" which became the highest selling single of 2004. His debut album That's What I'm Talking About was a number one, multi-platinum seller, as was his 2005 follow-up Lift. 

In 2007, Noll released his third album Turn It Up which reached number three and attained platinum certification, and he achieved his tenth consecutive top ten single, a record not reached by any other male Australian artist in Australian chart history. Sebastian, John Farnham and Jimmy Barnes have all achieved more top ten singles, but they were nonconsecutive. Since 2007 Noll has released nine further singles with three reaching the top fifty, the highest charting one peaking at number 26. He released a compilation album No Turning Back: The Story So Far in September 2008 which peaked at number seven. Noll left Sony at the end of 2009, and was signed to Universal Music Australia in 2010. In October 2011 he released his fourth studio album A Million Suns which reached number eight. As of October 2011, Noll has achieved eighteen platinum and four gold certifications for albums and singles.

Albums

Studio albums

Compilation albums

Video albums

Singles

As lead artist

As featured artist

Other appearances

Music videos

References

External links

Official website

Discographies of Australian artists
Rock music discographies